Jesus – The Film (aka: Jesusfilm) is a 1986 experimental feature film by German filmmaker Michael Brynntrup. This "Monumental Film" on Super 8 contains 35 episodes made by 22 filmmakers and collectives from East and West Germany. Each episode is a very loose interpretation of the stories, parables and stations of the life of Jesus.

Plot
Starting with the birth of the Jesus child, the film deviates wildly from the New Testament template, with the Virgin Mary now giving birth to twins, likely to give credence to the idea that Gnostic The Gospel of Thomas was actually written by the twin brother of Jesus. However, in keeping with tradition, only the life and suffering of the One is portrayed. Throughout the entire film, Jesus is shadowed by dark agents (the Four Evangelists) who seem to be the puppet masters of the story. But this preordained life spins out of control at the Last Supper, where Jesus develops a fondness for drinking blood. On his way to Calvary, he meets Saint Veronica and surrenders to this thirst, thereby acquiring immortality as a vampire. Jesus lives.

Production
The film's storyline, as well as the creative process of each episode, is inspired by the surrealist technique of the "exquisite corpse": the episodes' makers didn't know what happened in the previous scenes, receiving only a description of the last connecting shot – and sometimes also the use of previous cast members – in order to maintain the story's continuity. The constant figure in all the episodes was Michael Brynntrup, the initiator and coordinator of the overall project, in the role of Jesus.

The 127-minute film was shot in black and white on Russian Super 8 film stock. These Super 8 cassettes were smuggled out of East Germany, often under precarious conditions, and then distributed to the participating filmmakers. Due to financial constraints, much of the film processing was done by the filmmakers themselves. This also contributed to the film's look, recalling the expressionist classics of the silent movie era.

Reception
The film premiered at the 1986 Berlinale, as part of the International Forum of New Cinema, before going on a "Mission Tour" through 40 locations across West Germany that same year. Then in 1987, the film went on a "North America Mission", visiting 10 cities across the USA and Canada with the support of local Goethe Institutes.

The film won the top prize at the 1986 Salzgitter Film Festival and the prize for best production at the 1987 Caracas International Super 8 Festival. The film's 11-minute trailer (entitled Veronika – Vera Ikon ) received an honorable mention at the 1988 Friedberg International Festival of Religious Films and at the 1988 Tel Aviv International Student Film Festival.

In 2014 Jesus – the Film – the Book was published. The book is a bilingual (German/English) compilation of materials documenting the three years of the Jesus Film project, ranging from the initial ideas and research in 1984, through facsimiles of the Jesus Letters that were sent to participating filmmakers, a detailed project diary with notes on the dynamics of group work, additional production materials along with images of the shoot and of props that attained the status of relics, to facsimiles of program flyers from the months-long "Mission Tours" through West Germany (1986) and North America (1987). The book thus stands as an independent work of its own.

 "Jesus: Der Film is silly, sublime." (Chicago Sun-Times, Peter Keough)
 "The idea of the film is more important than its technical perfection." (Andy Warhol's Interview)
 "This film is the largest collective project in German film history. In the history of world cinema there are few works that can compare." (Jesus – Der Film – Das Buch, Randall Halle)

Cast
 Michael Brynntrup as Jesus
 Panterah Countess as Mary
 Jürgen Brauch as Satan and Joseph
 Hermoine Zittlau as Caiaphas
 Fabian Saladin Prinz von Hessen-Nassau as Pontius Pilate
 Stiletto as Saint Peter
 Uli Versum as John the Apostle
 Oliver Körner von Gustorff as Judas Iscariot
 Bertram Jesdinsky as John the Baptist
 Ulrich Sappok as the head of John the Baptist
 Heidi Paris as Angel
 Peter Gente as John of the Apocalypse

External links
 
 Official Website
 Jesus – Der Film – Das Buch, Verlag Vorwerk8, Berlin 2014,

References

1986 films
1980s avant-garde and experimental films
German avant-garde and experimental films
German anthology films
Films about Jesus
Films directed by Michael Brynntrup
Films directed by Jörg Buttgereit
West German films
1980s German-language films
German independent films
German vampire films
1980s German films